TMA-6 may refer to:
 2,4,6-Trimethoxyamphetamine, a hallucinogenic drug
 Soyuz TMA-6, a Russian space exploration mission